Hayk "Hayko" Hakobyan (25 August 1973 – 29 September 2021) was an Armenian singer and songwriter.

Biography
Hayko was born on 25 August 1973 in Yerevan, Armenia (then part of the Soviet Union). He studied at Yerevan Secondary School No. 170, then in Secondary School No. 32 named after Hovhannes Tumanyan. In 1987, he graduated from the Yerkhani Chukhachyan Music School and was admitted to R. Melikyan Music College.

He started his music career in 1996 with his first song Love.

He won Armenia's national selection for the Eurovision Song Contest 2007 in Helsinki. He represented Armenia in the Eurovision Song Contest in the final with the song "Anytime You Need". The song placed eighth in the contest.

Musical career

 In 1996, Hayko participated in the "Moskva 96" ("Moscow 96") festival; awarded First Prize.
 In 1997, he won the 1st prize at the "Big Apple" festival in New York City. 
 In 1998, he was acknowledged as "The Best Author – Performer" at the "Ayo" Author's Competition.
 In 1999, he was nominated for "The Best Singer" award.
 In 1999, he recorded his first CD called "Romance", which represented the well-known Armenian "city" songs with a new and fresh interpretation.
 In 2002, he was nominated in different categories at the Armenian Music Awards (The Best Singer, The Best Project and The Best Album) and this year became exceptional in his career. He won in all three nominations.
 In 2003, he got an Award at the "Armenian National Music Awards" for "The best DVD".
 In 2003, he gave his first solo concert at the "Alex Theatre" in the United States.
 On 27 May 2003, he gave a solo performance in Yerevan and recorded a DVD called "Live Concert"
 In 2003, he recorded his first author's CD called "Norits" ("Again").
 He was recognized as the Best Singer 2003 and 2006 at the Armenian National Music Awards.
 He entered the 2007 Eurovision Song Contest for Armenia with the song "Anytime You Need".

Death
Hayko, who had cancer, died on 29 September 2021, in Yerevan after contracting COVID-19 during the COVID-19 pandemic in Armenia. He was 48.

Discography
Romance (2000)
Norits (2004)
Live Concert (2004)
With One Word (2007)
Live Concert 2008 (2008)
Es Qez Siraharvel Em (2014)
Hayko Live Concert (2018)
Amena (2020)

References

External links
Official website

1973 births
2021 deaths
Deaths from the COVID-19 pandemic in Armenia
20th-century Armenian male singers
Musicians from Yerevan
Eurovision Song Contest entrants for Armenia
Eurovision Song Contest entrants of 2007
Armenian pop singers
21st-century Armenian male singers